The B. Mifflin Hood Brick Company Building is a historic building in Atlanta, Georgia. Located in the Virginia–Highland neighborhood, the building was built in 1909 and was added to the National Register of Historic Places in 2018.

History 
The building was constructed in 1909 to serve as a showroom and headquarters for the B. Mifflin Hood Brick Company. B. Mifflin Hood, a businessman who had moved to Atlanta from Philadelphia, founded the company in 1904 and distinguished his company from his competitors by marketing his products as "non-convict brick", as Hood did not participate in the convict leasing system that was prevalent in Georgia at this time. Hood also helped to improve the brick-making industry in the Southern United States by introducing new technological advancements and by founding a Ceramic Engineering Department at the Georgia School of Technology. In 1921, the building underwent a massive renovation project that tripled the area of the building. B. Mifflin Hood Brick Company continued to operate in the building until 1947. On December 6, 2018, the one-story, 11-bay building was added to the National Register of Historic Places. The building is located along the BeltLine.

See also 

 National Register of Historic Places listings in Fulton County, Georgia

References

External links 
 

Buildings and structures on the National Register of Historic Places in Georgia (U.S. state)
National Register of Historic Places in Atlanta
Buildings and structures completed in 1909
Virginia-Highland